Hymenopappus flavescens, the collegeflower, is a North American species of flowering plant in the daisy family.

Distribution and habitat
It grows in the southwestern and south-central United States (Kansas, Oklahoma, Texas, Colorado, New Mexico, Arizona) and northern Mexico (Chihuahua). It grows in sandy soils.

Description
Hymenopappus flavescens is a biennial herb up to 90 cm (3 feet) tall. It produces 15-100 flower heads per stem, each head with 20–40 yellow disc flowers but no ray flowers.

Varieties
Named varieties include:
Hymenopappus flavescens var. canotomentosus A.Gray New Mexico, Texas, Chihuahua
Hymenopappus flavescens var. flavescens - Colorado, Kansas, New Mexico, Oklahoma, Texas

References

flavescens
Flora of the Great Plains (North America)
Flora of the United States
Flora of the South-Central United States
Flora of Arizona
Flora of Chihuahua (state)
Plants described in 1849
Taxa named by Asa Gray
Flora without expected TNC conservation status